Tsentralny Administrative District is a district (raion) of the city of Kaliningrad, Kaliningrad Oblast, Russia. Population:

References

City districts of Kaliningrad